Combat Logistics Regiment 2 (CLR 2) is a logistics regiment of the United States Marine Corps.  The unit is based at Marine Corps Base Camp Lejeune, North Carolina and falls under the command of the 2nd Marine Logistics Group (2nd MLG) and the II Marine Expeditionary Force (II MEF).

Mission
CLR-2 provides direct support to the II Marine Expeditionary Force. They train, rapidly task organize, deploy, employ, fight and redeploy in order to provide direct support logistics combat support to all maneuver elements of II MEF beyond their organic capabilities, in peacetime as well as wartime, in any environment and across the spectrum of conflict in order to allow the II MEF maneuver elements to continue operations independent of any logistically driver operational pauses.

Subordinate units
 Combat Logistics Battalion 2 
 Combat Logistics Battalion 6
 Combat Logistics Battalion 8
 Combat Logistics Battalion 22
 Combat Logistics Battalion 24
 Combat Logistics Battalion 26

History

See also

 List of United States Marine Corps regiments
 Organization of the United States Marine Corps

References
Notes

Web

 CLR-2's official website

Combat logistics regiments of the United States Marine Corps